Manco Cápac (Quechua: Manqu Qhapaq, "the royal founder"), also known as Manco Inca and Ayar Manco was, according to some historians, the first governor and founder of the Inca civilization in Cusco, possibly in the early 13th century. He is also a main figure of Inca mythology, being the protagonist of the two best known legends about the origin of the Inca, both of them connecting him to the foundation of Cusco. His main wife was his older sister, Mama Uqllu, also the mother of his son and successor Sinchi Ruq'a. Even though his figure is mentioned in several chronicles, his actual existence remains uncertain.

Biography

Origin 

Manco Cápac was born in Tamputoco, which according to some is located in the present-day province of Pumaurco, in Peru. The city usually served as a refuge for many people escaping the Aymaran invasions  of the Altiplano. His father was named Apu Tambo. Manco Cápac and his family lived a nomadic lifestyle.

Foundation of Cusco 

After the death of his father, Manco Capac had to succeed him as the head of the ayllu, to which belonged several dozens of families. The members of the ayllu were nomads, and the trajectory of their journeys through the Altiplano resembles the journey described in the legend of the Ayar brothers. Upon arriving to the Cusco valley, they defeated three small tribes that lived there; the Sahuares, Huallas and Alcahuisas, and then settled in a swampy area between two small streams, that today corresponds with the main plaza of the city of Cusco. The recently founded city was divided into four districts; Chumbicancha, Quinticancha, Sairecancha and Yarambuycancha.

Manco Cápac's tribe, or ayllu, only occupied a small fraction of the Cusco valley, the rest of it being inhabited by larger and more powerful tribes, who often would threaten the city. Located at north of the city there was a confederated lordship of Ayarmacas and Pinaguas. All these tribes regarded Manco Cápac and his ayllu as invaders, and would often attack them. Manco Cápac, and later his son and successor Sinchi Roca would often have to defend the city against the other tribes.

Death 

Manqu Qhapaq died of a natural death and left his son, Sinchi Roca, as his successor in Cusco. His body was mummified and remained in the city until the reign of Pachacuti, who ordered its move to the Temple of the Sun on Isla del Sol. In Cusco there remained only a statue erected in his honor.

Mythological origin 

Manco Cápac is the protagonist of the two main legends that explain the origin of the Inca Empire. Both legends state that he was the founder of the city of Cusco and that his wife was Mama Uqllu.

Legend of the Ayar brothers 
In this legend, Manco Cápac (Ayar Manco) was the son of Viracocha of Paqariq Tampu (six leagues or 25 km south of Cusco). He and his brothers (Ayar Auca, Ayar Cachi and Ayar Uchu) and sisters (Mama Ocllo, Mama Huaco, Mama Raua and Mama Ipacura) lived near Cusco at Paqariq Tampu, and they united their people with other tribes encountered in their travels. They sought to conquer the tribes of the Cusco Valley. This legend also incorporates the golden staff, thought to have been given to Manco Cápac by his father. Accounts vary, but according to some versions of the legend, the Manco got rid of his three brothers, trapping them or turning them into stone, thus becoming the leader of Cusco.  He married his older sister, Mama Occlo, and they begot a son named Sinchi Roca.

Legend of Manqu Qhapaq and Mama Ocllo 
In this second legend, Manco Cápac was a son of the sun god Inti and the moon goddess Mama Killa, and brother of Pacha Kamaq. Manco Cápac himself was worshipped as a fire and a Sun God. According to the Inti legend, Manco Cápac and his siblings were sent up to the earth by the sun god and emerged from the cave of Pacaritambo carrying a golden staff, called tapac-yauri. Instructed to create a Temple of the Sun in the spot where the staff sank into the earth, they traveled to Cusco via caves and there built a temple in honour of their father Inti.

However, given the absence of a written tradition recounting this tale before the publication of Comentarios Reales de los Incas by Garcilaso de la Vega in the year 1609, the authenticity of this legend as a legitimate Incan legend is questioned.

In fiction 
The Scrooge McDuck comic book The Son of the Sun, written by Don Rosa, features Manco Cápac as the original owner of various lost treasures.

In the first chapter of Herman Melville's The Confidence-Man the sudden appearance at sunrise on April 1 of a mysterious fictional character is compared to Cápac's appearance out of Lake Titicaca.

In P.B. Kerr's Eye of the Forest, the fifth book in the Children of the Lamp series, Manco Cápac is said to be a powerful Djinn who took his place as a god amongst the Incas by displaying his power of matter manipulation.

In British author Anthony Horowitz's fantasy-thriller book series The Power of Five, Manco Cápac is the son of Inti, and one of five children destined to keep the universe safe from the forces of evil. Cápac is reincarnated in the 21st century as a Peruvian street beggar called Pedro.

Kuzco, the main character from Emperor's New Groove, in the first version of the movie Kingdom of the Sun was supposed to be named Manco Cápac.

Heritage
The car float Manco Capac operates across Lake Titicaca between PeruRail's railhead at Puno and the port of Guaqui in Bolivia.

References

Bibliography

Pugh, Helen Intrepid Dudettes of the Inca Empire (2020)

See also 

 Kingdom of Cusco
 Inca Empire

Inca gods
Solar gods
Fire gods
Inca emperors
Mythological kings
13th-century monarchs in South America
Year of birth unknown